Agrococcus jejuensis is a non-endospore-forming, Gram-positive, rod-shaped and non-motile bacterium from the genus Agrococcus which has been isolated from dried seaweed from the beach of Jeju.

References

Microbacteriaceae
Bacteria described in 2008